Best of Accept is a compilation album by German heavy metal band Accept, released in 1983. The songs on the album were pulled from Accept's earliest four solo albums, namely Accept, I'm a Rebel, Breaker, and Restless and Wild, which was released during the following year. This album omits more distinctive songs from the band's later years, such as those from their 1983 album Balls to the Wall.

A Greek edition of the album in 1984 included two tracks recorded at Monsters of Rock in Donington on August 18, 1984.

Track listing

Personnel
 Udo Dirkschneider – lead vocals (tracks 1–7, 9–10, live tracks)
 Wolf Hoffmann – guitar (all tracks)
 Jörg Fischer – guitar (tracks 1, 3–8, 10)
 Peter Baltes – bass guitar (all tracks), lead vocals (track 8)
 Stefan Kaufmann – drums (tracks 1–9, live tracks)
 Herman Frank – guitar (tracks 2, 9, live tracks)
 Frank Friedrich – drums (track 10)

References

1983 greatest hits albums
Accept (band) albums